Timothy M. Swager (born 1961) is an American Scientist and the John D. MacArthur Professor of Chemistry at the Massachusetts Institute of Technology.  His research is at the interface of chemistry and materials science, with specific interests in carbon nanomaterials, polymers, and liquid crystals.  He is an elected member of the National Academy of Sciences, American Academy of Arts and Sciences, and the National Academy of Inventors.

Career and research 
A native of Sheridan Montana, Swager earned his BS in Chemistry from Montana State University, received a PhD from the California Institute of Technology working with Robert H. Grubbs, and performed postdoctoral studies at the Massachusetts Institute of Technology under Mark S. Wrighton.  He began as an assistant professor at the University of Pennsylvania in 1990 and returned to MIT in 1996 as a Full Professor.  Swager is best known for advancing new chemical sensing concepts based on molecular electronic principles.  He introduced the concepts of charge and energy transport through molecular and nanowires as a method to create amplified signals to chemical events. These methods gave rise to the sensitive explosive sensors that have been commercialized under the trade name Fido. He demonstrated the integration of molecular recognition into chemiresistive sensors, first with conducting polymers and later with carbon nanotubes, and these methods were first commercialized by CSense.  He is also the cofounder of PolyJoule Inc. that produces organic batteries for stationary energy storage, and founded Xibus Systems that is developing improved methods for pathogenic bacteria detection in food production.

Swager also has pioneering contributions to the areas of liquid crystals demonstrating how novel molecular shapes can be used to introduce intermolecular correlations in structures and alignment. In the area of high strength materials, by creating interlocking structures with enhanced ductility and strength. In carbon nanomaterials he has developed methods for functionalizing and/or dispersing graphenes and carbon nanotubes. Also he has designed novel radical materials in collaboration with Robert G. Griffin (MIT) for dynamic nuclear polarization to enhance the signal to noise ratio in NMR experiments.  A number of these enhancement agents are commercially available from DyNuPol Corp.  Swager has published more than 500 peer reviewed manuscripts and has more than 100 issued patents. As of March 2023, he has a Hirsch index of 117.

Notable awards 
 2005 Carl S. Marvel Creative Polymer Chemistry Award, American Chemical Society
 2005 Christopher Columbus Foundation Homeland Security Award
 2007 Lemelson-MIT Award for Invention and Innovation
 2008 Honorary Doctorate of Science, Montana State University
 2013 Award for Creative Invention, American Chemical Society
 2016 Gustavus John Esselen Award for Chemistry in the Public Interest
 2016 Linus Pauling Award
 2019 Polymer Chemistry Award, American Chemical Society

Bibliography 
Swager, T. M.; Xu, B. "Liquid Crystalline Calixarenes" pages 389–398. in Calixarenes 50th Anniversary: Commemorative Issue Vicens, J.; Asfari, Z.; Harrowfeild, J. M. (Eds.) Kluwer Academic Publishers, Holland, 1994
Swager, T. M. "Polymer Electronics for Explosives Detection" pages 29–38 in Electronic Noses and Sensors for the Detection of Explosives, Gardner J.; Yinon, J., (Eds.) NATO Science Series II: Mathematics, Physics and Chemistry, 2004
Tovar, J. D.; Swager, T. M. "Synthesis of Tunable Electrochromic and Fluorescent Polymers" Chapter 28, pp 368–376 in Chromogenic Phenomena in Polymers, Jenekhe, S. A.; Kiserow, D. J. (Eds.) ACS Symposium Series, Volume 888, 2004
Swager, T. M. "Semiconducting Poly(arylene ethylene)s" pages 233–258 in Acetylene Chemistry: Chemistry, Biology, and Materials Science, Diederich, F.; Stang, P. J.; Tykwinski, R. R. (Eds.) Wiley-VCH 2005
Swager, T. M. "Realizing the Ultimate Amplification in Conducting Polymer Sensors: Isolated Nanoscopic Pathways" pages 29–44 in Redox Systems Under Nano-Space Control, Hirao, T. (Ed.) Springer-Verlag Berlin Heidelberg 2006
Thomas, S. W., III; Swager, T. M. "Detection of Explosives Using Amplified Fluorescent Polymers" pages 203–220 in Detection of Illicit Chemicals and Explosives; Oxley, J. C.; Marshall, M., (Eds.) Elsevier: New York, 2008.
B. VanVeller, T. M. Swager, "Poly(aryleneethynylene)s" pages 175–200 in Design and Synthesis of Conjugated Polymers, M. Leclerc, J. Morin (Eds.) Wiley-VCH: Weinheim, 2010.
Andrew, T. L.; Swager, T. M. "Exciton Transport through Conjugated Molecular Wires" in Charge and Exciton Transport through Molecular Wires Siebbeles, L. D. A.; Grozema, F. C. (Eds.) Wiley-VCH: Weinheim 2010
Levine, M.; Swager, T. M. "Conjugated Polymer Sensors: Design, Principles, and Biological Applications" Chapter 4, Pages 81–133, in Functional Supramolecular Architectures: for Organic Electronics and Nanotechnology Vol. 1 Samori, P.; Cacialli, F. (Eds.) Wiley-VCH: Weinheim 2010

References 

1961 births
Living people
21st-century American chemists
Members of the United States National Academy of Sciences
Massachusetts Institute of Technology School of Science faculty
California Institute of Technology alumni
Montana State University alumni